Playpen is a playgroup to grade 12 English-medium school in Bashundhara Residential Area, Dhaka, Bangladesh that was established in 1977 by Zeba Khan. It follows the curriculum of Cambridge International Examination (O-level) and Advanced Level (A-level) examinations.

It had three more principals since, Sabera Parveen Harun, Shahriar Quader and the incumbent principal, Sorabon Tohura respectively. The school has a handball, football and basketball teams. It also has a debate, baking, table tennis and drama club.

See also 
 List of schools in Bangladesh

References 

Schools in Dhaka District
Education in Dhaka
Educational institutions established in 1977
1977 establishments in Bangladesh